Ludwig "Pipin" Lachner (27 July 1910 – 19 May 2003) was a German footballer and manager.

Career 

Lachner began his career at the Munich-based worker's football club FT Gern in the Arbeiter-Turn- und Sportbund championship. He switched to 1860 Munich in 1929. In 1934 Lachner left Munich and joined Eintracht Braunschweig, where he played for the next 15 years. After retiring from top-level football in 1949, Lachner continued for a time as player-manager at MTV Braunschweig in the Amateuroberliga Niedersachsen.

During the 1950s and 60s, Lachner also worked as a football manager, including three stints at VfL Wolfsburg.

International career 

Lachner was capped eight times for the Germany national team, scoring four goals.

International goals
Scores and results table. Germany's goal tally first:

Honours 

 German championship runner-up: 1931

References

External links 
 

1910 births
2003 deaths
Footballers from Munich
German footballers
German football managers
Germany international footballers
Association football midfielders
Association football forwards
TSV 1860 Munich players
Eintracht Braunschweig players
VfL Wolfsburg managers
West German football managers